Short Circuit III is a concept album by Japanese music production unit I've Sound, released on June 25, 2010. It is the third album in the Short Circuit series, centering on their denpa songs. The album is a compilation of songs from various video games with two newly recorded original songs. It features the vocals of Kotoko, Kaori Utatsuki and three new I've vocalists: Airi Kirishima, Nami Maizaki and Lin Asami, who perform as a brand new I've Sound group, Larval Stage Planning.

Track listing

External links
Short Circuit 2010 special web 

2010 albums